Serbian Football Coach of the Year is an annual award given from Football Association of Serbia to the best football coach of the year. Originally it has been awarded the Football Association of Serbia and Montenegro. On the same occasion is also given an award for Serbian Player of the Year.

Winners

Serbian football trophies and awards
Association football manager of the year awards
Awards established in 2005
2005 establishments in Serbia
Annual events in Serbia